Russian rugby team may refer to:

 Russia national rugby union team
 Russia national rugby league team

Disambiguation pages